Josef Bárta, also Josef Bartha, (1744 in Prague - 13 June 1787 in Vienna ) was a Czech composer.

Bárta was a priest and organist at the Salvator Church in Prague. He then moved to Vienna. In addition to three operas and a singspiel, Bárta wrote piano sonatas, string quartets, and 13 symphonies. His other works are presumed lost.

Works 
La Diavolessa by Carlo Goldoni, 1772
Da ist nicht gut zu raten (There's no good guessing), comic opera, 1778
Der adlige Taglöhner (The noble laborer), singspiel, 1780
Il Mercato di Malmantile, 1784
13 symphonies, Prague, Narodni Muzeum (Milada Rutová)

Further reading 
Hellmut Federhofer: The Thundering Legion of Joseph Barta . In Rainer Cadenbach, Helmut Loos (ed.): Contributions to the history of the oratorio since Handel. Festschrift Günther Massenkeil 60th birthday. Voggenreiter, Bonn, 1986, .
Jaromír Havlík: Symfonie Antonína Laubeho a Josefa Barty . Prague 1975 (dissertation).
Camillo Schoenbaum: The Bohemian musicians in the music history of Vienna from Baroque to Romanticism . In: Studies in Music Science (StMw) 25, 1962, (Festschrift for Erich Schenk).

External links
 Works by and about Josef Bárta in the catalog of the German National Library

1744 births
1787 deaths
Czech classical composers
Czech male classical composers
18th-century classical composers
18th-century male musicians
18th-century musicians
Czech organists
Male organists
18th-century keyboardists
Musicians from Prague